Rosa pinetorum is an uncommon species of rose known by the common name pine rose. It is endemic to California, where it occurs in the coniferous forests of the Central Coast Ranges around Monterey Bay.

Taxonomy
The taxonomy of this and related roses is difficult.

References

External links
Jepson Manual Treatment - Rosa pinetorum
Rosa pinetorum - Photo gallery

pinetorum
Endemic flora of California
Bird food plants
Natural history of Monterey County, California
Natural history of Santa Cruz County, California